The 1965 Amateur World Series was held in Cartagena, Colombia from February 12 through February 27, 1965. It was the 16th Amateur World Series. The Cuban national team was denied a chance to defend its title as Colombia, then run by a right-wing regime, refused to grant visas to Cuba's players.

Final standings

References

Baseball World Cup, 1965
Baseball World Cup
1965
Amateur World Series
Amateur World Series
Sport in Cartagena, Colombia